Professor Ram G Takwale is a former Vice Chancellor of the University of Pune from 1978 to 1984, a former Vice Chancellor of the Indira Gandhi National Open University and former Chairman of National Assessment and Accreditation Council.

References

Academic staff of Indira Gandhi National Open University
Living people
Year of birth missing (living people)
Academic staff of Savitribai Phule Pune University
Heads of universities and colleges in India